Mariem Ben Chaabane (born July 30, 1983) was a Tunisian actress. She is especially known for her roles in the Tunisian series Casting and Machair.

Biography 
Meriam Ben Chaabane was born on July 30, 1983. In 2007 she graduated from the University of Sorbonne Nouvelle Paris 3  with a bachelor's degree in performing arts theater specialty. The actress had dancing and singing Trainings as well, She has also managed  theater Workshops.

In 2010 Mariem was discovered by Tunisians audience with her role of Dorra mnawer in the Tunisian series "Casting". Yet in 2012 she made a strong comeback with her role in the series Maktoub.

She was on the cover of the Tunivisions people magazine in September 2012.

In 2016, she starred in two series which were broadcast during the month of Ramadan, Awled Moufida and Flashback, The actress also appeared in the movie Woh! by the Tunisian director Ismahane Lahmar.

In 2019 Mariem Ben Chaabane took a leading role in the Tunisian Television series Machair by the Turkish director Muhammet Gok, she starred as Meriem "A fightful women who has brain cancer and has only a few days left to live". The series made a huge success in the Maghreb area during Ramadan 2019, Her role was admired by the Tunisian and Maghreb audience.

Filmography

Film 
 2014 : Face à la mer by Sabry Bouzid
 2016 : Woh ! by Ismahane Lahmar

Television 
 2010 : Casting by Sami Fehri : as Dorra Mnawer
 2012 : Maktoub (3rd season) by Sami Fehri : as Chekra Ben Sallem
 2013 : Layem by Khaled Barsaoui
 2016 : Awled Moufida (saison 2) by Sami Fehri
 2016-2017 : Flashback by Mourad Ben Cheikh
 2019 : Machair by Muhammet Gök : as Meriem : Maryem Yahiya

References

External links 

1983 births
Living people
Tunisian film actresses
Tunisian television actresses